The 1961 Bolivian Primera División, the first division of Bolivian football (soccer), was played by 8 teams. The champion was Deportivo Municipal.

League table

External links
 Official website of the LFPB 

Bolivian Primera División seasons
Bolivia
1961 in Bolivian sport